Absaroka–Beartooth Wilderness was created from existing National Forest lands in 1978  and is located in Montana and Wyoming, United States. The wilderness encompasses two distinct mountain ranges, namely the Beartooth and Absaroka ranges. These ranges are completely distinct geologically speaking with the Absarokas composed primarily of volcanic (or extrusive) and metamorphic rock, while the Beartooths are made up almost entirely of granitic rocks. The Absarokas are noted for their dark and craggy appearance, lush and heavily forested valleys and abundant wildlife. The Beartooths are more alpine with huge treeless plateaus and the highest peak in the state of Montana (Granite Peak ). The wilderness is an integral part of the  Greater Yellowstone Ecosystem and borders Yellowstone National Park.

Wilderness areas do not allow motorized or mechanical equipment including bicycles. Although camping and fishing are allowed with proper permit, no roads or buildings are constructed and there is also no logging or mining, in compliance with the 1964 Wilderness Act. Wilderness areas within National Forests and Bureau of Land Management areas also allow hunting in season.

The forests are dominated by various species of spruce, fir and pine while in the Beartooth Mountains, due to the altitude, tundra conditions often prevail. Animals found in the wilderness include bald eagles and yellowstone cutthroat trout and the threatened grizzly bear and lynx as well as the gray wolf.

Access to the wilderness is difficult but can be achieved via the Beartooth Highway US 212 from Red Lodge, Montana. There are also some forest access roads from the west off of US 89 south from Livingston, Montana.


Highlights 

The Absaroka–Beartooth Wilderness is full of beautiful landscapes. Below are some of the highlights:

 East Rosebud – Many avid hikers say that "East Rosebud is the most scenic valley of all." It is filled with lakes and waterfalls that would be major tourism draws anywhere else. In fact, there are so many different waterfalls and lakes within this valley that many of them have yet to be named. Slough Lake is found within the East Rosebud valley.
Mystic Lake – the deepest lake in the Beartooth Mountains.  It has the largest sandy beach in the Beartooths and is a wonderful destination for a day hike.  The Montana Power Company does utilize the power of this large lake, and they do have a dam present, but they do as much as possible to maintain the wilderness.  Mystic Lake supports a rainbow trout fishery, and the fishing is usually great when the fish are feeding. Hiking the trail up  to Mystic Lake provides great views of West Rosebud Valley and a few other lakes.

Beartooth Panic
Regretfully, many visitors to the wilderness area are ill-prepared for hiking through wilderness areas. "Beartooth Panic" often comes to people who like the idea of wilderness exposure, but are unprepared for the lack of Cell site and Wi-Fi. Many people give up and expect helicopters to be sent out to them to pick them up and take them back to their cars. Others become disoriented, and helpless, when their Global Positioning System, cell phones and laptops don't work. Many carry maps and a compass, but don't know how to use them. "Traditionally, wilderness has been used by those individuals willing to test the very substance of their body and soul. In the wilderness, humans are still at the mercy of natural forces. If you do not have innate survival skills, combined with the right training, you can be eaten by a bear or die in a storm. These risks were understood and accepted in the past. But that spirit seems foreign to a new breed of "outdoorsmen" who embrace the appearance but not the substance of adventure."

See also
List of U.S. Wilderness Areas

References

Further reading
 Absaroka Beartooth Task Force. The Proposed Absaroka Beartooth Wilderness: A Wilderness Analysis and Management Recommendation. Bozeman, Mont: [ABTF], 1971. 
 Beartooth Publishing. Absaroka Beartooth Wilderness, Montana, Wyoming, Outdoor Recreation Map: Hike, Mountain Bike, Horseback, Dirt Bike, ATV, Fish, Hunt. 2015.
 Coleman, Mervin D. Beartooth Country: The Absaroka and Beartooth Ranges. Helena, MT: Farcountry Press, 2012. 
 Schneider, Bill, and Richard K. Stiff. Hiking the Absaroka–Beartooth Wilderness. Guilford, Conn: Falcon, 2015.
Silkwood, J.T. and G.N. Green. (2000). Generalized geologic map of the Absaroka–Beartooth study area, south-central Montana [U.S. Geological Survey Miscellaneous Field Studies; Map MF-2338]. Reston, VA: U.S. Department of the Interior, U.S. Geological Survey.
 United States. A Proposal, Beartooth Wilderness, Custer and Gallatin National Forests, Montana. [Missoula, Mont]: Dept. of Agriculture, Forest Service, 1974. 
 United States. Absaroka Beartooth Wilderness, Custer, Gallatin, and Shoshone National Forests, Montana and Wyoming: 1988. [Missoula]: The Office, 1988. 
 Walcott, Francis J., and Rick Amorose. Absaroka–Beartooth Wilderness Study. [San Francisco?]: Sierra Club, 1973. Notes: "A report on the wilderness studies of the Absaroka and Beartooth Primitive Areas and adjacent lands, conducted during the past several years by the Sierra Club. From the Wilderness Committee, Sierra Club."
 Wild resurrection: the untold story of the Absaroka–Beartooth Wilderness. 2018. DVD. Abstract: The history of the Absaroka–Beartooth Wilderness in Montana.

External links
 
 
 

Protected areas of Carbon County, Montana
Greater Yellowstone Ecosystem
IUCN Category Ib
Protected areas of Park County, Montana
Protected areas of Park County, Wyoming
Shoshone National Forest
Protected areas of Stillwater County, Montana
Protected areas of Sweet Grass County, Montana
Wilderness areas of Montana
Wilderness areas of Wyoming
Gallatin National Forest
Custer National Forest
1978 establishments in Wyoming
1978 establishments in Montana
Protected areas established in 1978